Streptomyces coerulescens is a bacterium species from the genus of Streptomyces which has been isolated from soil. Streptomyces coerulescens produces gilvocarcin M, gilvocarcin V, coerulomycin and anantin.

See also 
 List of Streptomyces species

References

Further reading

External links
Type strain of Streptomyces coerulescens at BacDive -  the Bacterial Diversity Metadatabase

coerulescens
Bacteria described in 1958